MadHouse is a TV series that aired on the American cable History Channel in 2010. It follows four teams of Modified class race car drivers through the 2009 season at Bowman Gray Stadium. The Modified Division is NASCAR's oldest division, and while the Northeast is the most popular region for this class of motorsport (NASCAR Hall of Fame member Richie Evans from Rome, NY, was a nine time Modified Division champion and won the inaugural touring series championship for Modifieds), it is a fan favorite at the Piedmont Triad's quarter-mile speedway.

Junior Miller, Tim "The Rocket" Brown, Burt and Jason Myers and Chris Fleming are the five drivers who are followed throughout the series. Later drivers Jonathan "Jon Boy" Brown, Austin Pack, and Gene Pack are introduced to the audience.

Episodes

Cancellation and possible return

In March 2010 The History Channel cancelled the show before the final episode of season one was aired. Subsequently, the producers of the show have indicated that there will be a season two and have been in negotiations with The Speed Channel and with The Discovery Channel as well as other yet unnamed networks about picking up Madhouse for the 2011 program line up. According to Triage Entertainment website they did have a film crew filming for a season two in mid-to-late 2010. As of December 2010 the only network that has been stated by Triage Entertainment to pick up the show has been Speed Channel but no official air date has been announced or whether the show will air as Madhouse or under a different show name. Set to air on Discovery Channel at 10 PM ET on October 29 of 2018, Race Night at Bowman Gray will be next reality show for the famous Bowman Gray Stadium.

References 

 History Channel Strikes Gold With MadHouse
 What Short Track Racing Can Learn From MadHouse

External links 
 

2010s American reality television series
History (American TV channel) original programming
Television shows set in North Carolina
2010 American television series debuts
2010 American television series endings